Antônio Pedro de Jesus (born 26 July 1947), known as Toninho, is a Brazilian former footballer who played as a forward. He competed in the men's tournament at the 1968 Summer Olympics.

References

External links
 

1947 births
Living people
Brazilian footballers
Association football forwards
Brazil international footballers
Olympic footballers of Brazil
Footballers at the 1968 Summer Olympics
Footballers from São Paulo
São Paulo FC players